Hubail is a surname. Notable people with the surname include:

A'ala Hubail (born 1982), Bahraini footballer
Mohamed Hubail (born 1981), Bahraini footballer